The present day Bumble Hole Branch Canal and Boshboil Branch surround Bumble Hole, a water-filled clay pit, in Bumble Hole and Warren's Hall Nature Reserve, Rowley Regis, West Midlands, England. They formed a looped part of the original Dudley No. 2 Canal until the opening of the Netherton Tunnel in 1858 when the loop was bypassed by a new cut, in line with the new tunnel. Part of the bypassed canal loop, which surrounds Bumble Hole, is now in-filled giving access to the pool of Bumble Hole. An area next to the Bumble Hole and Dudley canals is the Bumble Hole Local Nature Reserve.

Cobb's Engine House
Between Windmill End Junction and the tunnel portal stands Cobb's Engine House, built in 1831 to pump water from coal mines into the canal.

Bumble Hole railway
The Bumble Hole railway was used to cross the canal near Windmill End Junction, but was dismantled in 1969.

Canal map

Features

See also

Canals of the United Kingdom

References

Further reading

External links
Cruising the BCN - photographs
English Nature - Bumble Hole and Warrens Hall LNRs

Canals in the West Midlands (county)
Birmingham Canal Navigations
Local Nature Reserves in the West Midlands (county)